Harry & Meghan: Escaping the Palace is a 2021 historical fiction television film. Set three years after the royal wedding of Prince Harry, Duke of Sussex, and Meghan, Duchess of Sussex, it covers their withdrawal from the royal family and the birth of their son Archie. The movie originally aired on the Lifetime Network on September 6, 2021, and it constitutes a second sequel to Harry & Meghan: A Royal Romance from 2017 and Harry & Meghan: Becoming Royal from 2019.

Cast
Jordan Dean as Prince Harry, Duke of Sussex
Sydney Morton as Meghan, Duchess of Sussex
Jordan Whalen as Prince William, Duke of Cambridge
Laura Mitchell as Catherine, Duchess of Cambridge
Steve Coulter as Charles, Prince of Wales
Deborah Ramsay as Camilla, Duchess of Cornwall
Bonnie Soper as Diana, Princess of Wales 
Keegan Connor Tracy as Lady Victoria
Maggie Sullivan as Queen Elizabeth II

References

External links

2021 drama films
2021 films
2021 television films
Drama films based on actual events
Lifetime (TV network) films
Cultural depictions of Prince Harry, Duke of Sussex
Cultural depictions of Meghan, Duchess of Sussex
Films scored by Mario Grigorov
Films directed by Menhaj Huda
American drama television films
2020s American films